Samuel Green (1796 – April 25, 1822) was a United States serial killer and robber. He was one of the first to be called "Public enemy", in the United States, as a dangerous criminal at-large.

Early life
Samuel Green was born in Meredith, New Hampshire in 1796. At an early age, his parents believed him to be possessed by a demon because of his frequent school skipping and would whip him. As a teenager, he became a blacksmith's apprentice where he was whipped for stealing. He was whipped for destroying the blacksmith's garden but did not admit it. He was then sent home and whipped again. In retaliation, Green threw the family dog down a well, contaminating the water, and caused great expense to the family. He was beaten severely for this. He retaliated by slashing the neck of the family pig and was again whipped.

The family gave up and sent Samuel to live with family friend Albert Dunne in New Hampton, New Hampshire. Green attended school for a while but began skipping again. He then stole a Jew's harp from a shop and Dunne beat him as punishment. Green fled home and his parents, having heard of the theft, beat him unconscious. Green was sent to Dunne and then whipped until the flesh was flayed off his back.

For the last beating, Green  set up a trap to kill Dunne. He put an axe, that would fall on his head, and a pitchfork, that would strike him, in the barn door. When Dunne entered the barn, the axe sliced his coat and the pitchfork gave him a slight foot injury. Dunne then tied Green against a barn door, severely whipping and bloodying him for the attempted murder. Afterwards, Green destroyed a hogshead of cider, stole bushels of corn, and tried to burn down Dunne's barn. As usual, he was whipped and beat by Dunne.

After a few months, Green became too strong for Dunne, who let him be. Later, Green met another youth named William Ash.

Criminal career
Green and Ash went to New Hampton where they met a traveling salesman named Franklin Loomis. He became their mentor, teaching them how to forge bank notes and burglarize homes of the rich, businesses, and banks. One day they came by a schoolhouse and Green hurled a large piece of timber underneath a sleigh full of children, putting them in danger. The schoolmaster caught the two and severely beat them. Later that night, they lay in wait for the schoolmaster to come and knocked him unconscious with rocks, stripped him, tied him up and hoped he would freeze. However, he was found and survived.

Green and Ash traveled through Guilford and Burlington, Vermont, where Green joined the army. He deserted, but was captured and flogged. Later, Green escaped to New Hampshire and reunited with his family. He had become wealthy by this time because of his counterfeiting. Green bought his mother a cow and spent the rest of his money on fancy clothes, a horse, jewelry, and meals.

Green ran out of money and left for Boston, where he became a servant for wealthy men. During the day, he was a loyal servant but at night Green robbed the homes of valuables and fled. Around this time, Green went back to Loomis, who had taught him how to pick locks more efficiently and make duplicate keys. Green and Ash had robbed hundreds of homes and offices. In Bath, New Hampshire, the two met a jewelry salesman who let them inspect his goods. They ambushed him when he rode past. He was knocked from a mule and clubbed to death to eliminate a witness.

Green then went around New England, killing and robbing. He was imprisoned on suspicion several times but released as there was insufficient evidence. Ash also helped him escape jail numerous times. After robbing a store of jewels in Montreal he was pursued by a posse, shooting and killing several of the men. He was later captured and sentenced to hang in a short trial. Ash helped him escape and Green hid in the mountains in New Hampshire.

Green then began burglarizing homes and stores in New York City and Albany. Later, he killed a wealthy French traveler in Middlebury, Vermont. Green would go on to rape, steal horses, burglarize, counterfeit and murder from Montpelier, Vermont, to Schenectady, New York; and from Saco, Maine, to Barre, Vermont. He became "public enemy number one". High bounties were placed on him.

Final capture and aftermath
Green was arrested for robbing a store in Danvers, Massachusetts while drunk. He was convicted of burglary, sentenced to four years in prison and sent to prison in Boston. Green tried to escape several times and had to wear special shackles and clogs to slow him. He had more years added to his sentence.

Green later found out that another prisoner, Billy Williams, had told officials of and thwarted his previous escape. Once Green was out of solitary confinement, he poisoned Williams' food; however, Williams did not eat it. On November 8, 1821, Green attacked Williams and fractured his skull with an iron rod. While still unconscious, Williams was continuously struck with the iron rod and had his ribs, arms, and legs broken by Green. Williams succumbed to his injuries the next week.

Green was convicted of murder and given an execution date of April 25, 1822. At the gallows, Green informed the priest he had nothing to say to the many spectators in attendance. "They shall not know my fate," he said. "I have written out my confession in full." The priest replied "Are you penitent, my son?" With the rope placed, Green gave the priest a long stare and a thin smile curled upward as he replied "If you wish it."

See also 
List of serial killers in the United States

References

Further reading
A Selection of Leading Cases in Criminal Law: With Notes, Volume 2
United States Criminal History, Being a True Account of the Most Horrid Murders, Piracies, High-way Robberies, &c.,/ Together with the Lives, Trials, Confessions and Executions of the Criminals. Comp. from the Criminal Records of the Countries by P. R. Hamblin

1796 births
1817 crimes in the United States
1819 crimes in the United States
1821 crimes in the United States
1822 deaths
1818 murders in the United States 
1820 murders in the United States
1822 murders in the United States 
19th-century American criminals
19th-century executions by the United States
19th-century executions of American people
American counterfeiters
American escapees
American people convicted of burglary
American rapists
American robbers
Criminals from Massachusetts
Criminals from New Hampshire
Executed American serial killers
Executed people from New Hampshire
Fugitives
Male serial killers
People convicted of murder by Massachusetts
People executed by Massachusetts by hanging
People from Meredith, New Hampshire
People from New Hampton, New Hampshire